Harold Hitchcock (23 May 1914 – 8 August 2009), born Raymond Hitchcock, was an English visionary landscape artist.

Biography
Born in Camden Town, London into a family of artists (descended from the animal artist George Stubbs on his mother’s side), Harold was inspired to paint as a result of an ecstatic experience he had as a young boy whilst living with his grandparents in the Essex village of Thundersley.  At the age of 16 he was hailed in the press as a child prodigy as a result of the enthusiasm of Dame Laura Knight for his work. He went into commercial art.

In the Second World War, as a conscientious objector in the Non-Combatant Corps, he volunteered for bomb disposal work.
He continued to paint and in 1945 was given an exhibition of his work by Margaret Torrie, who was very influential on the London art scene at that time running the International Arts Centre in west London. Margaret and her husband Alfred, both Quakers, later introduced Harold to the spiritual movement Subud, which had a profound effect on his life and work.

After the war and now married, Harold enjoyed much success selling his work at the Hampstead open-air exhibition. and in 1964 he gave up commercial work to concentrate on his own painting full-time. He came to the attention of Hastings, 12th Duke of Bedford, who became a patron, giving Harold an exhibition at his palatial home. Woburn Abbey. Major London exhibitions followed as did a widening market for his work in the US.  His work was admired by art establishment figures of the time, including Kenneth Clark and Sir Roy Strong, then director of the Victoria and Albert Museum. In 1984 Hitchcock was given the rare honour of a retrospective exhibition at the RSA gallery in London.

Art
His work is purely imaginative – often depicting, in fine detail, a romantic mythological world of idealised beauty, suffused in light, and reminiscent of the 17th-century painter Claude Lorraine.  However, his art often has a peculiarly English quality following in the tradition of artists such as William Blake (in his adoption of a personal mythology) and particularly Samuel Palmer in his depiction of a pastoral idyll.  His use of light also recalls the paintings of J.M.W. Turner. Remarkably unaffected by modern trends in art, he followed his own unique inner vision, working in a spontaneous way with great technical skill.

Later works have additionally included a more figurative and semi-abstract style, but without sacrificing the prismatic jewel-like quality of light and colour seen in the landscapes.

Gallery

Public presentations

Exhibitions
 Walker Gallery,   London   1956
 Mercury Gallery  London
 Ewan Phillips  London
 Austin Hayes  London
 Rimmell Gallery  London
 DaVinci Gallery  London
 Leicester Galleries  Leicester Sq.  London
 Reid Gallery  Bond St.  London   1967
 Woburn Abbey   Sponsored by the Duke of Bedford   1967
 Royal Institute Gallery  London    Retrospective   1967
 Upper Grosvenor Gallery  London   1969
 Kurt Schon Gallery   New Orleans  USA  1971
 Touring Exhibition  USA  during 1972  [including exhibitions at Atlanta City, Huntsville, Winston-Salem, Daytona Beach, New Orleans]
 Pilkington Glass Museum,  UK   1973
 Campbell and Franks Gallery,  Harley St. London   1975
 Christopher Wood Gallery  London   1983
 Royal Society of Arts  Picadilly, London   1984
 Christopher Wood Gallery  London   1986
 New Orleans Museum of Art   1988
 Hanson Gallery  New Orleans   1989
 Marikay Vance Gallery  Chicago   1992
 Agora Gallery New York  1999
 Phillip Gallery  California  1999
 Phillips Gallery San Jose 2003
 Phillips Gallery  Carmel   2004

Permanent collections
 Rowntree Memorial Trust  UK
 Lidice Memorial Museum   Czechoslovakia
 Museum of Fine Art  N.Carolina USA
 University of Louisiana  USA
 Victoria and Albert Museum  London
 Hunterian Museum  Glasgow  Scotland
 University Library of Winston-Salem  USA

References

 Harold Hitchcock, 'A Romantic Symbol In Surrealism’ by Ian Williamson,  Walker and Co, New York, 1974. 
 'Life In Light'  Phillips Publishing, Carmel, 2000.

External links
 Artist's Homepage
 undiscoveredworldspress.com
 johncoulthart.com

English conscientious objectors
Landscape artists
20th-century English painters
English male painters
21st-century English painters
21st-century English male artists
1914 births
2009 deaths
People from Camden Town
People from Thundersley
Personnel of the Non-Combatant Corps
20th-century English male artists
Military personnel from Middlesex